Counter-beam lighting (German: Gegenstrahlbeleuchtung) is a type of road lighting used mainly in road tunnels, providing best visibility of obstacles on the lane at minimum light-energy cost. It means increased roadway safety and energy savings.
The counter-beam lighting is mostly installed at road tunnel entrances (transition zone), because there, especially in sunshine and entry speeds up to 100 km/h, the "blindness" (cf. Adaptation) of the vehicle driver in the first seconds should be avoided. With conventional lighting technology, very high luminances with correspondingly high energy costs would have to be provided in these areas to make obstacles on the roadway sufficiently visible.

Principle of counter-beam lighting 
The light from the lamps does not shine perpendicularly down onto the roadway, but towards the vehicle. With a carefully chosen angle of inclination and suitable lighting fixtures (Streetlights#Lamps), the driver is not blinded and the roadway acts as a mirror that also scatters the light toward the vehicle. Since the road surface is a poor mirror (gray surface), the driver is not blinded, but perceives the road as a bright surface. An obstacle on the roadway casts a (dark) cast shadow against the direction of travel with this oblique incidence of light. This shadow and the surface of an obstacle that is turned away from the light source and therefore less illuminated offers the vehicle driver the sight of a black surface on the bright roadway (high contrast). The black surface seen is larger than the obstacle itself, making it easier to perceive the hazard. With perpendicular light incidence, brighter, more expensive lamps with much higher energy requirements and greater maintenance overhead would have to be used to achieve equivalent visibility of obstacles. Therefore, counter-beam lighting is an environmentally friendly contribution to road safety.

History 
Contrast lighting traces its origins to the work of Ing. W. Ernst Freiburghaus (* 1921, Berne, Switzerland, † 2006, Berne, Switzerland), who was commissioned by BKW (Bernische Kraftwerke AG, today BKW Energie), Berne, Switzerland, to prepare theoretical work and practical installations (Worblaufen underpass, Bern, Switzerland) in the early 1960s. The theoretical findings were further developed and published by the Swiss Federal Office of Metrology, today Federal Institute of Metrology, Berne, Switzerland (without crediting the author). On the basis of his developments, BKW requested by letter of February 24, 1968, the inclusion of counter-beam lighting (then called BKW system with oblique beam [System BKW mit Schrägstrahlung]) in the Guidelines for Public Lighting, 2nd part, Road Tunnels - and Underpasses, of the Swiss Lighting Commission, but this was rejected. Various Swiss highway tunnels have since been equipped with this lighting system (in the 1970s, for example, the Allmend Tunnel of the motorway [Autobahn] A6, the Leimern Tunnel and the Rugentunnel of the A8). The system in the Rugentunnel of the A8 was positively evaluated by the Technical Committee TC 4 of the CIE in 1980. Today, counter-beam lighting is a natural part of almost all national and international tunnel lighting guidelines (see Standards) and can be found in countless road tunnels around the world.

Standards 
Counter-beam lighting is incorporated into the recommendations of the International Commission on Illumination and many countries'.
 International Commission on Illumination: CIE, Vienna, Austria; CIE 088:2004, 1990, Guide for the Lighting of Road Tunnels and Underpasses, ISBN 978-3-901906-31-2.
 Research Society für Street and Traffic Affairs  Forschungsgesellschaft für Straßen- und Verkehrswesen (FGSV): Richtlinien für die Ausstattung und den Betrieb von Straßentunneln (RABT). Köln, Germany 2003.
 German Institute of Norms [ Deutsches Institut für Normung (DIN) e.V.], NA 058 Normenausschuss Lichttechnik (FNL): DIN 67 524-1, Beleuchtung von Straßentunnels und Unterführungen. Berlin 1987.
 Swiss Association for Standardization [ Schweizerische Normen-Vereinigung (SNV)]:  (PDF; 70 kB)
 Austrian Research Society Street - Rail - Traffic  Forschungsgesellschaft Straße – Schiene – Verkehr:  Guidelines and Rules for Road Traffic  Richtlinien und Vorschriften für das Straßenwesen  (RVS) 09.02.41 Beleuchtung

References 

Road tunnels